Julianne is an English language given name ultimately derived from the Latin Iuliana, the feminine form of Iulianus (Julian), probably via the French Julienne. The name is often thought to be made up from Julia + Anne.

Notable people with the given name Julianne include:

Julianne Adams (born 1966), Australian wheelchair basketball player
Julianne Baird (born 1952), American soprano of mainly Baroque works, both opera and sacred music
Julianne Bournonville, a name used by Julie Alix de la Fay, a Belgian ballet dancer and dance pedagogue
Julianne Boyd (born 1944), American theater director
Julianne Buescher (born 1965), voice actress and puppeteer
Julianne Courtice, English squash player
Julianne Dalcanton, American astronomer
Julianne Hough (born 1988), American professional ballroom dancer and country music singer
Julianne Kirchner (born 1991), Marshallese swimmer, who specialized in sprint freestyle events
Julianne MacLean, Canadian author of romance novels, primarily historical romance
Julianne Malveaux (born 1953), African-American economist, author, liberal social and political commentator and businesswoman
Julianne McNamara (born 1965), American artistic gymnast
Julianne Michelle (born 1984), American film and television actress
Julianne Moore (born Julie Anne, 1960), American actress
Julianne Morris (born 1968), American actress
Julianne Nicholson (born 1971), American actress
Julianne Ortman (born 1962), US senator (R) Minnesota
Julianne Phillips (born 1960), American actress, model, and former wife of Bruce Springsteen
Julianne Pierce, Australian new media artist, curator, art critic, writer, and arts administrator
Julianne Regan (born 1962), English singer, song writer, and musician known for her work with the band All about Eve
Julianne Schultz AM (born 1956), Australian academic, journalist and author
Julianne Séguin (born 1996), Canadian figure skater
Julianne Sitch (born 1983), American professional soccer defender
Nicole Julianne Sullivan (born 1970), American actress, comedian, and voice artist
Julianne Tarroja (born 1983), Filipina singer-songwriter

Fictional characters with the name include
 Julianne Potter, a character played by Julia Roberts in My Best Friend's Wedding

Variations

Juliane (given name)
Juliana (given name)
Julianna
Julienne (given name)
Giuliana
Iuliana, Iouliana (Ιουλιάνα)
Iulianna, Ioulianna (Ιουλιάννα)
Uljana
Yuliana

English feminine given names